Francine Pascal (née Rubin, born May 13, 1938) is an American author best known for creating the Sweet Valley series of young adult novels. Sweet Valley High was the backbone of the collection, and was made into a popular television series. There were also several spin-offs, including The Unicorn Club and Sweet Valley University. Although most of these books were published in the 1980s and 1990s, they remained so popular that several titles have been re-released in recent years.

Biography

Francine Rubin was born in Manhattan, New York, and raised in Queens, New York, United States. Her father was an auctioneer. She began her writing career writing scripts for the soap opera The Young Marrieds alongside her husband, John Pascal. The couple also wrote a Broadway musical, George M!, with her brother Michael Stewart. Her first novel, Hangin' Out With Cici, was later turned into an ABC Afterschool Special, My Mother Was Never a Kid. A friend then convinced her to turn her idea of a soap opera aimed at teenagers into a book series, which became the successful Sweet Valley High series, which she oversaw a team of ghostwriters to deliver. She later developed other work, including the Fearless series, Save Johanna! and The Ruling Class. Her husband died from cancer in 1981, which inspired her novel If Wishes Were Horses, where the protagonist moves to France following the death of her husband.

See also
 List of Sweet Valley High books
 List of Sweet Valley High episodes
 List of Sweet Valley University novels

Sources 

 The Continuum Encyclopedia of Children's Literature (Continuum International Publishing Group, 2005)
 The 100 Most Popular Young Adult Authors: Biographical Sketches and Bibliographies (Bernard A. Drew: Libraries Unlimited, 1997)
 The Season: A Candid Look at Broadway (William Goldman: Harcourt, Brace & World, 1969)
 George M! (Book by Michael Stewart, John Pascal, and Francine Pascal: Tams-Witmark, 1968; National Broadcasting Co., 1970)
 Hello, Dolly! (Book by Michael Stewart and Jerry Herman: Signet Books, 1964)
 Bye Bye Birdie (Book by Michael Stewart: DBS Publications, Inc., 1962)
 Carnival! (Book by Michael Stewart: DBS Publications, Inc., 1968)
 Mack & Mabel: A Musical Love Story (Book by Michael Stewart, Samuel French, Inc., 1976)
 The Strange Case of Patty Hearst (John Pascal and Francine Pascal: Signet Books, 1974)
 The Young Marrieds (John Pascal and Francine Pascal: American Broadcasting Co., 1964–1966)
 Hangin' Out with Cici (Francine Pascal: Pocket Books, 1977)
 My Mother Was Never a Kid Afterschool Special (Original Title: Hangin' Out with Cici – Book by Francine Pascal, Screenplay by Jeffrey Kindley: American Broadcasting Co., 1981)
 My First Love and Other Disasters (Francine Pascal: Dell, 1980)
 Love and Betrayal & Hold the Mayo (Francine Pascal: Viking Press, 1985)
 The Hand-Me-Down Kid (Francine Pascal: Viking Press, 1980)
 The Hand-Me-Down Kid Afterschool Special (Book by Francine Pascal, Screenplay by Judy Engles: American Broadcasting Co., 1983)
 Save Johanna! (Francine Pascal: Morrow, 1981)
 If Wishes Were Horses (Francine Pascal: Crown, 1994)
 La Villa (Re-release of If Wishes Were Horses – Francine Pascal: Pocket Star, 2004)
 The Ruling Class (Francine Pascal: Simon & Schuster, 2004)
 Caitlin Trilogy Book Series (Created by Francine Pascal: Bantam Starfire, 1985–1988)
 Sweet Valley Book Series (Created by Francine Pascal: Random House, 1983–2009)
 Sweet Valley Television Series (Created by Francine Pascal: Saban Entertainment, 1994–1997)
 Fearless Book Series (Created by Francine Pascal: Simon & Schuster, 2000–2003)
 Fearless: FBI Book Series (Created by Francine Pascal: Simon & Schuster, 2005–2006)
 Fearless Television Series (Never Released – Created by Francine Pascal: Warner Bros. Television and Jerry Bruckheimer Television, 2004)
 Amazon Books (Amazon Services, LLC, 2009)
 Fantastic Fiction Limited, Lancashire, UK

References

External links 
 Random House Sweet Valley Website
 Simon & Schuster Fearless Website
 Simon & Schuster Fearless: FBI Website
 Fantastic Fiction: The Ruling Class Review
 Internet Broadway Database: George M!
 Internet Movie Database: George M!
 Tams-Witmark Music Library
 Internet Movie Database: ABC Afterschool Specials
 Jamie Stewart's Memorial Website

20th-century American novelists
21st-century American novelists
American women novelists
American writers of young adult literature
Living people
1938 births
Novelists from New York (state)
New York University alumni
American soap opera writers
American women dramatists and playwrights
20th-century American women writers
21st-century American women writers
20th-century American dramatists and playwrights
Women soap opera writers
Women writers of young adult literature
Screenwriters from New York (state)